Genesys International Corporation is an Indian mapping, survey and geospatial service company established in 1995.

References 

Indian companies established in 1995
Companies listed on the National Stock Exchange of India
Companies based in Mumbai
1995 establishments in Maharashtra